The Selph Building is one of the first commercial buildings to be built in the downtown area of Stillwater, Oklahoma.

Description and history 
The structure was built in 1913, and was originally designed to house a physician's office on its second floor. The first floor was used for various commercial enterprises including a shoe repair shop and cafe. The Selph was one of the first buildings to provide for a public restroom.

The building is of red brick with limestone trim. On the south facade there is a brick outhouse. Other nearby historic buildings include the Santa Fe Depot, the Citizens Bank Building, the Hoke Building, the Walker Building, and the Courthouse.

The building was added to the National Register of Historic Places on September 12, 1983.

References

Buildings and structures in Stillwater, Oklahoma
Commercial buildings on the National Register of Historic Places in Oklahoma
National Register of Historic Places in Payne County, Oklahoma
Commercial buildings completed in 1913